Karishma Kaa Karishma (English: The Magic of Karishma) is an Indian television series which is a remake of the 1980s American TV series Small Wonder. The series premiered on Star Plus on 24 January 2003. It is produced by Sunil Doshi of Alliance Media & Entertainment, and starring Jhanak Shukla as the cyber kid Karishma.

Plot
The story revolves around a scientist, Vikram, who designs a very lifelike robot. His goal is to find out if the robot (Karishma) will become more human-like as time goes on. His wife, Sheetal, who is easily influenced by her neighbour Shraddha, suspects Vikram to be having an extramarital affair due to his late work hours. But Vikram reveals the AI robot Karishma to the family and explains he was working on making her, Sheetal accepts Karishma as a daughter. Rahul, Vikram and Sheetal's son, is constantly annoyed by his neighbor, Sweety, who has a crush on him. Vikram and his family are the only ones who know that Karishma is a robot. Their nosy neighbors Shraddha and Paresh interfere in their lives and try to figure out who Karishma really is. This is the premise for a lot of episodes. Every episode, Karishma saves the day by solving the family's problem.

Cast
Jhanak Shukla as Karishma Vikram Malhotra (A robot)
Sanjeev Seth as Vikram Malhotra (Rahul and Karishma's father)
Eva Grover/Tisca Chopra as Sheetal Vikram Malhotra (Rahul and Karishma's mother)
Mayank Tandon as Rahul Vikram Malhotra
Bhavana Balsavar as Shraddha Paresh Parekh
Shweta Prasad as Sweety Paresh Parekh
Jamnadas Majethia as Paresh Parekh
Athit Naik as Pintu/ Prince
Kurush Deboo as Lappu (The Coward Ghost)
Hansika Motwani as Tina (Sweety's Cousin) Ep 18 (Also appeared as a Chinese Child Robot)
Daisy Irani as Maasi Ji
Aditya Kapadia as Rishta (Sweety's American Cousin)

References

External links

StarPlus original programming
Indian television series based on American television series
2003 Indian television series debuts
2004 Indian television series endings
Robots in television
Indian children's television series
Indian science fiction television series
Indian television sitcoms
Androids in television
Hindi language television sitcoms